= Penn Pfiffner =

American politician

Member of the Colorado House of Representatives from the 23rd district
- In office January 13, 1993 – January 10, 2001
- Preceded by: Marleen Fish
- Succeeded by: Kelley Daniel

Personal details
- Born: October 1, 1954 (age 71) Honolulu, Hawaii
- Party: Republican

Penn Pfiffner (born October 1, 1954) is an American politician who served in the Colorado House of Representatives from the 23rd district from 1993 to 2001.
